Lenka Valová (born 18 April 1983) is a Czech cyclist. She competed in the women's individual pursuit at the 2004 Summer Olympics.

References

1983 births
Living people
Czech female cyclists
Olympic cyclists of the Czech Republic
Cyclists at the 2004 Summer Olympics
Sportspeople from Třebíč